On 26 July 2020, 4 people were stabbed in Moss Side in Manchester, England, 17-year-old Mohamoud Mohamed died at the scene. The incident was the result of a gangland feud between Rusholme Crips and Moss Side's AO, or, 'Active Only'. Both gangs are believed to have grown out of Manchester's notorious Gooch and Doddington outfits.

The attack happened a month after a mass shooting in the same area that killed two people.

Incident and conviction 
Police were called to a disturbance in Henbury Street, Moss Side, at 7:30 pm. A murder investigation was launched following the death of one of the victims, teenager Mohamoud Mohamed.  The alleged perpetrators and members of Moss Side's AO were arrested the next day. On the 12th of February, 2021, four men were convicted of manslaughter; Daneaco Reid, 19; Jamall Walters, 18; Romeo Daley, 18; and a 17-year-old boy. age, were all arrested and charged with murder.

Music 
"It's the latest case when rap and drill lyrics have been the dark undercurrent to shocking crimes on the streets of Manchester." Members of the two rival Manchester gangs would often release music and videos taunting and threatening each other, which some believe has led to more violence. In court, some of the music from AO's members was played, lyrics to one particular track said: "I swear that's Mo let's kill him, kill him...". The gang members and music artists often express their allegiance in music through the use of certain hand signals, and wearing  different colours, Moss Side's AO wearing the red bandana, and Rusholme Crips wearing light blue.

References 

2020 in England
2020s in Manchester
Crips
July 2020 crimes in Europe
July 2020 events in the United Kingdom
Stabbing attacks in 2020
Stabbing attacks in England
Crime in Manchester
Violence in Manchester
Attacks in the United Kingdom in 2020
2020s crimes in Manchester